An oath of office is an oath or affirmation a person takes before assuming the duties of an office, usually a position in government or within a religious body, although such oaths are sometimes required of officers of other organizations. Such oaths are often required by the laws of the state, religious body, or other organization before the person may actually exercise the powers of the office or organization. It may be administered at an inauguration, coronation, enthronement, or other ceremony connected with the taking up of office itself, or it may be administered privately. In some cases it may be administered privately and then repeated during a public ceremony.

Some oaths of office are statements of allegiance and loyalty to a constitution or other legal text or to a person or office-holder (e.g., an oath to support the constitution of the state, or of loyalty to the king or queen) (see Oath of allegiance). Under the laws of a state, it may be considered treason or a high crime to betray a sworn oath of office.

The word "oath" and the phrase "I swear" refer to a solemn vow. For those who choose not to, the alternative terms "solemn promise" or "solemnly affirm" and "I promise" or "I affirm" are sometimes used.

Antigua and Barbuda
The Governor-General of Antigua and Barbuda, before entering into his duties, must make an oath of allegiance and oath of office in the form specified in the Constitution of Antigua and Barbuda; the same is required of the Prime Minister, other Ministers and Parliamentary Secretaries, but they also take the oath of secrecy.

Members of the Public Service Commission for Antigua and Barbuda take the oath of allegiance and oath of office, while members of both Houses of Parliament are only required to make the oath of allegiance prior to participating in their respective House (save for the oath-taking itself). Any of these oaths may be taken as an affirmation; when doing so "So help me God" is omitted.

The oath of allegiance is set forth as follows:

I, ___, do swear (or solemnly affirm) that I will faithfully bear true allegiance to His Majesty King Charles the Third, His  Heirs and Successors, according to law.

So help me God.

The oath of office is set forth as follows:

I, ___, do swear (or solemnly affirm) that I will honour, uphold and preserve the Constitution of Antigua and Barbuda and the law, that I will conscientiously, impartially and to the best of my                ability discharge my duties as and do right to all manner of people without fear or favour, affection or ill-will.

So help me God.

The oath of secrecy is set forth as follows:

I, ___, do swear (or solemnly affirm) that I will not on any account, at any time whatsoever, disclose any counsel, advice, opinion or vote given by any Minister as a member of the Cabinet and that I will not, except with the authority of the Cabinet and to such extent as may be required for the proper conduct of the government of Antigua and Barbuda, directly or indirectly reveal the business or proceedings of the Cabinet or any matter coming to my knowledge as a member of (or Secretary to) the Cabinet.

So help me God.

Australia

All members of the Australian Parliament are required to take before taking their seat in Parliament an Oath or Affirmation of Allegiance before the Governor-General of Australia. The requirement to take the oath is set out in section 42 of the Australian Constitution and the wording of the oath and affirmation are set out in a schedule to the Constitution. The oath is:

The affirmation is:

Upon taking office, the Governor-General of Australia is required to take the above Oath of Allegiance as well as a second Oath of Office:

In addition to swearing, the Oath of Allegiance upon becoming a Member of Parliament, the Prime Minister, Ministers and Parliamentary Secretaries also recite an Oath of Office upon entering office. The wording of this oath is not prescribed within the Constitution and is ultimately determined by the Prime Minister of the day. Traditionally the oath has repeated the swearing of allegiance to the Sovereign, although this is not required. The current Oath of Office is:

Bangladesh
The President, Prime Minister, Chief Justice, Speaker, Ministers take their oath of office. The oath is taken in the Bengali.

President
The oath (or affirmation) of the President is administered by the Speaker:

Prime Ministers and other Ministers
The oath of office for the Prime Minister and other members of the cabinet is administered by the President:

Speaker
The Speaker of the Jatiya Sangsad, takes the oath of his or her office as well as the presidential oath, since the acts of president is practiced by the Speaker, whenever necessary:

Chief Justice
The oath of office for the Chief Justice is administered by the President whereas the oath of office for other Judges is administered by the Chief Justice:

Others
The Election Commissioners, members of the Public Service Commission and the Comtroller and Auditor General takes a likely oath of office from the Chief Justice.

The representatives of the people in the local government takes oath from the Prime Minister or the minister in charge of the Local Government Division.

Belarus
The Constitution of Belarus requires the president-elect to recite the following oath before taking office:

Belgium

King
In Belgium, the King is not crowned but swears the constitutional oath in front of both Chambers of the federal parliament in the Palace of the Nation in Brussels in the three official languages:

In English: I swear that I will observe the constitution and laws of the Belgian people, preserve the country's independence and protect its territorial integrity. (Article 91 of the Belgian Constitution)

Prime minister, ministers and state secretaries
The prime minister, the ministers and state secretaries of the Belgian federal government swear an oath in front of the Belgian King.

Also the minister-presidents of the Flemish government, of the Walloon government, of the government of the French community, of the government of the German-speaking community and of the Brussels-Capital region government swear the oath at the King. The other members of these governments do not take the oath at the King, but in front of their respective parliaments.

They may choose to take the oath in one or more of the country's languages.

In English: I swear fidelity to the King, obedience to the constitution and to the law of the Belgian people.

Members of the Parliaments
The members of the Chambers of Representatives, the Senate, the Flemish Parliament, the Walloon Parliament, the Parliament of the French Community, the Parliament of the German-speaking Community and the Parliament of the Brussels-Capital Region have to swear the following oath:

In English: I swear obedience to the constitution.

Public servants
All public servants in judiciary and administration, officers of the civil guards and the army and servants in general of any public office have to swear the same oath as ministers.

Mayors and members of municipal executive and city council 
Flemish mayors and the members of municipal executive and the city council in Flanders have following oath: "Ik zweer de verplichtingen van mijn mandaat trouw na te komen" (I swear to fulfill the duties of my office faithfully).

In Walloon the following version is used: "Je jure fidélité au Roi, obéissance à la Constitution et aux lois du peuple belge."

Brazil

The affirmation required by the Constitution of Brazil to be taken by the president-elect upon entering into office is as follows:

In Portuguese: 

In English 

The vice-president is required to take the same pledge.

The affirmations of office required of members of the National Congress of Brazil are specified in the rules of procedure of each house (the Chamber of Deputies and Senate)

The Oath taken by the senators (In Portuguese): 

In English: 

The internal rules of the Supreme Federal Court set out the affirmation that must be taken by justices upon their investiture. Other judges make different affirmations, as provided for by law or in the internal rules of each Court.

The Constitution and laws of the several states and the organic laws of the municipalities also specify affirmations that must be made by the key officers of those entities.

Brunei

In Brunei, it is known as Oath or Declaration of Allegiance which any person in the public services may require to take if His Majesty the King and the Head of Government (Yang Di-Pertuan Negara) wishes.

Bulgaria

The members of the Bulgarian parliament, the prime minister,  government ministers, the president and vice president have to swear the following oath before entering office:

In English, "I swear in the name of the Republic of Bulgaria to observe the Constitution and the laws of the country and in all my actions to be guided by the interests of the people. I have sworn." The oath is dictated by the chairman of the National assembly and the ceremony is held in the National assembly building. When the president or the prime minister (and cabinet ministers) swears the oath, the Constitution is also on display near the speaking tribune.

Canada

No formal oath is required to be taken by the monarch.

Governor general
The Governor General of Canada is required to take the "Oath for the due execution of the Office of Our Governor General and Commander-in-Chief in and over Canada, and for the due impartial administration of justice", which includes swearing allegiance to the reigning Canadian monarch the viceroy is to represent. This oath must be administered by the Chief Justice of the Supreme Court of Canada or a puisne justice and, though not demanded, this is usually done during a swearing-in ceremony in the Canadian Senate chamber.

Ministers
All Ministers of the Crown, including the Prime Minister of Canada, must be sworn members of the Queen's Privy Council for Canada before taking office. The Clerk of the Privy Council administers the necessary oaths at Rideau Hall in the presence of the Governor General. The first oath taken is always the Oath of Allegiance:

The Oath of Allegiance is followed by the Privy Council Oath:

Privy Councillors who are Ministers-designate, including the Prime Minister-designate, become Ministers by taking the Oath of Office, which is administered by the Clerk of the Privy Council at Rideau Hall:

Ministers who choose to take the oath as an affirmation use declare instead of swear and omit so help me God. After leaving Cabinet, former Ministers typically remain Privy Councillors for life, and as such retain the privilege of styling themselves "The Honourable" (or "The Right Honourable," in the case of the Prime Minister), and may use the post-nominals "P.C."

China

Mainland China 

On July 1, 2015, the 15th Meeting of the 12th Standing Committee of the National People's Congress passed the Decision of the National People's Congress Standing Committee Regarding the Implementation of a Constitutional Oath System, with an effective date of January 1, 2016. The Decision requires state civil servants elected or appointed by the National People's Congress, its Standing Committee, the State Council, the Central Military Commission, the Supreme People's Court, the Supreme People's Procuratorate, and other central government organs, as well as equivalent local government organs at or above the county level, to publicly swear an oath to the constitution upon formally taking office.

As prescribed by the decision, the oath is as follows (as amended in 2018):

Unofficial English translation:

Hong Kong 

The oath of office for the Chief Executive is as follows:

The oath of office for the Principal Officials is as follows:

The oath of office for the unofficial members of the Executive Council is as follows:

The oath of office for the members of the Legislative Council  is as follows:

The oath of office of judges is as follows:

During the colonial era, the Governors of Hong Kong were required by Hong Kong Royal Instructions and Hong Kong Letters Patent to take the Oath of Allegiance, the Official Oath and the Judicial Oath of the United Kingdom before assuming the office.

Costa Rica
In Costa Rica, the oath of office is administered to the President-elect on Inauguration Day, and to all other public officials on the day of the undertaking of their duties. The oath of office for the President of Costa Rica is administered to him, or her, by the President of the Asamblea Legislativa de Costa Rica. It is established in the Political Constitution of the Republic of Costa Rica (Article 194):

Croatia
Before assuming duty, the President-elect of the Republic takes oath of office before the judges of the Constitutional Court swearing loyalty to the Constitution:

Egypt

Before assuming duty, the President-elect of the Republic and the ministers takes oath of office :

Fiji
In Fiji, the oath of office for the President of Fiji and Vice-President of Fiji are set out in Chapter 17 of the Constitution of Fiji.

Finland

General oath of office.
In Finland, the oath of office  is sworn by
The Chancellor of Justice and the Assistant Chancellor of Justice
The chief of staff of the office of the President of Finland,
the following officials of the Finnish Government, the office of the Chancellor of Justice or of any government ministry:
heads of office
 the secretaries and under-secretaries of state
heads of section
heads of central agencies
provincial governors
heads of diplomatic or consular missions
all career military personnel of Finnish Defence Forces and the Finnish Border Guard
prison governors

The oath of office is:

Those who do not want to swear the religious oath may give an affirmation. In this case, the words "promise and swear before almighty and all-knowing God" are replaced by "promise and affirm by my honor and by my conscience".

Policemen and some other persons executing justice make a written affirmation of office instead of an oath. The text of the affirmation is

In Finnish practice, the oaths of office are given only once. If the person who has given an oath or affirmation moves to another duty where such oath is required, the oath is not given anew.

Presidential affirmation of office
The President of Finland gives the following affirmation of office:

Oath of judges
Finnish judges and justices of all courts are required to give the following oath:

Those taking an affirmation do not use the parts involving God.

All Finnish cabinet ministers are required to give both the general oath or affirmation of office and the oath of judge, unless they have given these oaths and affirmations before. Like the general oath of office, the oath of judge is given only once.

Military oath

All Finnish conscripts are required to give the military oath or affirmation. The oath or affirmation is given in the end of the basic training using the formula:

Germany

The oath of office of the Federal President, Federal Chancellor, and other federal ministers in Germany is as follows:

The religious affirmation may be omitted. The first chancellor to do this was Gerhard Schröder in 1998, the second was Olaf Scholz in 2021.

Each of the 16 Länder (states) has its own oath of office for the Minister Presidents and other ministers, also for the Länder employees.

The oath for soldiers in Germany reads as follows:

Depending on the oath's interpretation, the following translation is also possible:

In both of the above, conscripts say "vow" instead of "swear", and the religious affirmation is not added for conscripts since the vow is not an actual oath.

The oath for federal Beamte:I swear to protect the Basic Law for the Federal Republic of Germany and all valid laws within the Federal Republic and to fulfill my duties of the office faithfully, so help me God.The oath for federal judges according to § 38 DRiG is as follows: (State (Länder) judges may have to add a commitment to the state constitution (Landesverfassung) to their oath)I swear to exercise judicial office in conformity with the Basic Law of the Federal Republic of Germany and with the law, to adjudicate to the best of my knowledge and belief, without distinction of person, and to serve the cause of truth and justice alone – so help me God.

Ghana

The oath of office of the President of Ghana is as follows:

For members of the Parliament of Ghana, the oath is:

Greece
Article 59 of the Constitution of Greece states that members of parliament must take the following oath:

Article 33 of the Constitution of Greece states that the President of the Hellenic Republic must take the following oath:

Guatemala
Article 181 of the Guatemalan Constitution provides that the incoming president of Guatemala should raises his or her right arm up to shoulder-level before the President of the Congress of Guatemala and say the following oath of office in Spanish:

Afterwards, the outgoing President passes him the Guatemalan flag (the Banda Presidential), which is worn from the left shoulder to the right rib, to the new president along with the presidential pin and with the Constitutional Collar.

India

President of India
The oath of office for the President of India is as follows:

Vice President of India
The oath of office for the Vice President of India is as follows:

Prime Minister of India and the Union Ministers of India
The oath of office for Prime Minister of India and other members of the Union Council of Ministers:

The oath of office is as follows: 

The oath of secrecy is as follows:

Chief Justice of India and Judges of the Supreme Court of India
The oath of office for Chief Justice of India and the judges of Supreme Court of India is as follows:

Indonesia

President and Vice President
Based on Article 9 of the 1945 Constitution of the Republic of Indonesia about the Oath of Office and Promise of the President and Vice President:

Before assuming office, the President and the Vice-President shall take the oath of office according to their religions, or solemnly promise before the People's Consultative Assembly (MPR) or the People's Representative Council (DPR) session as follows:

The President's/Vice-President's Oath of Office (for Muslims):

The President's/Vice-President's Promise:

In case any sessions can not be held, like one in 1998 when the protesters took control of the parliament building, the oath can be performed before the MPR chairperson and vice chairpersons, as well as the Chief Justice and his/her deputies with presence of the chairperson of every chambers.

Cabinet members and Presidential Work Units (UKP)

In the past, between the pronunciation of God according to each religions and "so help me God" expression, the oath was as follows (note that before the second and third sentence, they will be started with "I swear", regardless of the religions): 

To refer the god for Hindus, the oath used to use sentence "In the name of Sang Hyang Widhi", and later "Om Swastiastu". There was also a time when Protestant and Catholic ministers said "I swear" instead of promise at the beginning of the oath, only refer God in the last sentence. The verses "to seek the welfare" was removed since it reflected the dictatorial New Order era.

Armed Forces/Police oath of commissioning/enlistment
For officers:

For enlisted personnel of the Armed Forces and new cadets to the military academies and the Army Officer Candidate School:

Iran

The oath of office for the President of Iran is as follows:

For members of the Majlis of Iran, the oath is as follows:

According to the Iranian Constitution, MPs belonging to religious minorities may swear by the holy books of their respective faiths.

Oath of Judge
Iranian judges of all courts are required to give the following oath:

Ireland
The Constitution of Ireland specifies, for each of three offices, a "declaration" which the holder must "make and subscribe" before taking office. 

The declarations' references to God were criticised in a 1993 report of the United Nations Human Rights Committee. The 1996 Constitution Review Group proposed that the President and members of the Council of State should be permitted to substitute a non-religious affirmation. In contrast, it recommended a uniform non-religious oath for all judges, on the basis that impartiality was more central to the judicial function and would be compromised by providing a choice of words.

The "solemn declaration" for members of the Garda Síochána was revised in 2005. Its reference to God may be omitted. Members pledge not to "belong to or subscribe to, any political party or secret society whatsoever".  In the Defence Forces, the "Oath or Declaration" differs between permanent and reserve forces, and between commissioned officers and enlisted members. The wording makes no reference to God; it was changed in 1979 when women were first admitted.

Members of the Oireachtas and of the Government do not make any oath. From the foundation of the Irish Free State in 1922, both had to make an oath of allegiance to the Constitution and of fidelity to King George V.  This controversial provision of the 1921 Anglo-Irish Treaty contributed to the Civil War of 1922–23. The Oath was abolished by Fianna Fáil in 1932–33. Since then, Oireachtas members are required by standing orders to sign the roll before first taking their seats. The Governor-General of the Irish Free State took the same Oath of Allegiance and Oath of Office as the Governor General of Canada. This did not take place in public.

Israel
In Israel, the Basic Laws specify oaths of office of high-ranking members of the government.

For the President of Israel, there is a "Declaration of Loyalty":

In the Knesset, the oath of office (or "declaration of allegiance") is as follows:

Each other member of the Knesset, in turn: I pledge myself.

The Prime Minister of Israel has to make the following "declaration of allegiance" upon taking office:

Each of the other Ministers has to swear:

Italy

In Italy, before taking office, the President is required by Article 91 of the Constitution to take an oath of allegiance to the Republic and swear to uphold the Constitution before Parliament in joint session. The oath of office of the President is the following:

Also, Article 54 of the Constitution requires public officials to fulfil their functions with discipline and honour, taking an oath to that effect in those cases established by the law. The Prime Minister and members of the Council are sworn in by the President with the following oath of office:

South Korea 
In South Korea, before taking office, the President is required by Article 67 of the Constitution.
As prescribed by the decision, the oath is as follows:

Unofficial English translation:

Lebanon
In Lebanon, the president must take the following oath before the Parliament:

Luxembourg
Article 5 of the Constitution of Luxembourg prescribes the following oath for a new Grand Duke:

The oath for a Regent is:

A Lieutenant of the Grand Duke takes an oath to respect the Constitution, but no exact text is prescribed.

Deputies at the Chamber of Deputies (the Luxembourg parliament) take the following oath upon taking office:

All civil servants take the following oath:

Malaysia

Yang di-Pertuan Agong and Deputy Yang di-Pertuan Agong 

Article 37 of the Federal Constitution requires the Yang di-Pertuan Agong (King) and his deputy to take the Oath of Office before the Conference of Rulers.

The Yang di-Pertuan Agong take the oath of office as follows:

Next, the Deputy Yang di-Pertuan Agong take the oath of office as follows:

Executive and legislative members 

Federal Constitution requires the various executive and legislative members to take the Oath of Office and Allegiance as follows:

The oath is read according to the various section of the Constitution:

The Members of Parliament and Senators take the Oath based on Article 59 (1) of the Federal Constitution as follows:

Judicial members 

Article 124 of the Federal Constitution requires the Chief Justice, the President of the Appeal Court, Chief Judge of the High Court, higher court justice and judicial commissioners to take the Oath of Office and Allegiance as follows:

Mexico
Article 87 of the Mexican Constitution provides that the incoming President of the Republic must take the following affirmation (called protesta by the Mexican legislation) before the Congress of the Union:

The incoming President takes this affirmation whilst standing and raising his right arm up to shoulder level. Afterwards, the outgoing President passes the Presidential Sash (Banda Presidential) to the President of the Congress, who then gives it to the new President for him to wear it as a symbol of his office.

Moldova
Article 79 of the Constitution of Moldova provides that the President, no more than 45 days after his election, and before the Parliament and Constitutional Court, gives the following oath:

Myanmar
The Fourth Schedule of the 2008 Constitution of Myanmar has outlined the text of the legislative oath that freshly elected or military-appointed Members of Parliament must read aloud before joining parliament:

Netherlands

King
As set out by the Swearing-in and Investiture Act, the oath of office for the monarch of the Netherlands, which in accordance with Article 32 of the Constitution is to be declared as soon as possible after the King or Queen takes office in a public united meeting of the States General in the capital of Amsterdam, is as follows:

After this declaration the chairman of the States General, in the name of the States General, the States of the Netherlands Antilles and the States of Aruba, pronounces the following solemn declaration:

The declaration shall then be sworn or confirmed by each of the members individually.

Ministers, state secretaries and members of Parliament
The oath of office for ministers and state secretaries, which shall be administered by the King, and for members of Parliament is as follows:

Civil servants
The oath of office for civil servants is as follows:

New Zealand

Governor-General
The chief justice of New Zealand administers the oath of office at the swearing-in of new governors-general of New Zealand. The oath is as follows:

An affirmation may be used instead of this oath.

Norway
As soon as the King, being of age, accedes to the Government, he shall take the following oath before the Storting (article 9 of the Constitution of Norway):

If the Storting is not in session at the time, the oath shall be made in writing in the Council of State and be repeated solemnly by the King at the first subsequent Storting.

Pakistan
The oath of office of the President of Pakistan is as follows:

The oath of office of the Prime Minister of Pakistan is as follows:

Philippines
The oath of office of the President of the Philippines as written in the 1987 Constitution is as follows:

The oath from the Filipino language version of the constitution was used for the inauguration of Presidents Fidel V. Ramos, Joseph Estrada, Benigno Aquino III and Bongbong Marcos:

Prior to the 1987 Constitution the oath of office for the President of the Philippines is as follows:

During the second inauguration of President Ferdinand Marcos, a Filipino language version of the 1935 Constitution oath of office was used.

During the inauguration of President Corazon C. Aquino, this version was used:

The oath of office requirement for all public officers and employees of the government including every member of the armed forces is as follows:

The oath of office for all public officials and employees is as follows:

Filipino version:

If done for personnel of the Armed Forces of the Philippines, instead of legal orders/mga katususang legal, the phrase lawful orders/mga utos na ayon sa batas is used.

Poland

President

"So help me God" (Tak mi dopomóż Bóg) formula at the end is optional.

Prime Minister, Deputy Prime Minister, Minister

"So help me God" (Tak mi dopomóż Bóg) formula at the end is optional.

Sejm Members and Senators

"So help me God" (Tak mi dopomóż Bóg) formula at the end is optional.

Portugal
The Constitution of Portugal requires that the following oath be taken by the President-elect upon entering into office:

In Portuguese:

In English:

Romania

President
Article 82 of the Constitution of Romania provides that the President, before the Chamber of Deputies and Senate in joint session, gives the following oath:

Local officials
Article 32 of the Law 215 (23 April 2001) provides that all local officials (Local Councilors, Mayors, County Councilors and County Council Presidents), before the assembled Councils and the Prefect of the county, give, in Romanian the following oath.

The religious formula may be omitted.

Russia
The oath of office of the President of Russia is prescribed in the Constitution of Russia, in Chapter 4 (The President of the Russian Federation), Article 82:

1. When taking office the President of the Russian Federation shall take the following oath of loyalty to the people:

2. The oath shall be taken in a solemn atmosphere in the presence of members of the Federation Council, deputies of the State Duma and judges of the Constitution Court of the Russian Federation.

Russian Empire
During the Coronation of the Russian monarch, after his anointing, but prior to  partaking of Holy Communion, the Tsar recited a coronation oath, in which he swore to preserve the autocracy intact and to rule his realm with justice and fairness.

Singapore

The oath of office of the President of Singapore is as follows:

The Prime Minister of Singapore swears 2 oaths: the Oaths of Office and Oath of Affirmation respectively:

For Ministers of the Cabinet of Singapore, they swear the Oaths of Allegiance and Execution of Office respectively:

For members of the Parliament of Singapore, it is:

San Marino
The Captains Regent of San Marino are sworn into office by reciting the following oath:

South Africa
Schedule 2 of the Constitution of South Africa specifies the oaths or affirmations of office for the various high offices of state. These oaths are sworn before the Chief Justice or another judge designated by the Chief Justice.

The President and any Acting President swears the following oath:

The Deputy President swears the following oath:

Ministers and Deputy Ministers of the Cabinet swear the following oath:

Members of the National Assembly, the National Council of Provinces and the provincial legislatures swear the following oath:

Premiers, Acting Premiers and Members of the Executive Council of a province swear the following oath:

Judges and acting judges swear the following oath:

Spain
Article 61 of the Spanish Constitution requires the King to take the following oath as soon as practicable after ascending to the Throne and before performing any other official duty:

The heir to the Crown, upon becoming of age, and any Regents, upon taking office, are required by the Constitution to take the same oath, adding to it a vow of allegiance to the King.

In an inauguration ceremony a new Spanish Prime Minister takes an oath or affirmation of office over an open Constitution, which may be next to a cross and a Bible, and before the King of Spain and other dignitaries.

Other ministers take a similar oath.

Sweden
In Sweden, a judge, whether a legally trained judge or a lay judge shall take the following oath before assuming the duties of their office:

Switzerland 

In Switzerland, according to the Federal Act on the Federal Assembly, people elected at the Swiss Federal Assembly or elected by it (such as the Swiss Federal Council) have to take an oath in front of the assembly.

The oath is as follows:

The solemn promise is as follows:

Republic of China (Taiwan) 
In the Republic of China (mostly Taiwan and surrounding islands), oath of office is required to be taken by the President-elect before assuming office. The Oath of office for the President of the Republic of China is specified in the Constitution of the Republic of China (Article 48):

Turkey
All members of the Turkish Parliament, as well as cabinet ministers that are not members of parliament are required to take the following oath in a parliamentary session before taking office.  The Turkish President takes a slightly modified version of this oath:

All members of the Turkish Armed Forces should take the following oath before starting their service:

Ukraine

President of Ukraine

In Ukraine, the Chairman of the Constitutional Court of Ukraine administers the oath of office. The President-elect recites the oath with his hand on the Constitution and the Peresopnytsia Gospels. The Ukrainian text of the oath according to the article 104 is:

The official English translation:

People's Deputies of Ukraine

Before assuming office, a People's Deputy of Ukraine must take the following oath before the parliament:

In original Ukrainian:

In English translation:

A refusal of taking the oath is followed by the loss of a deputy's mandate.

Members of the Cabinet of Ministers
After being approved by the Parliament, members of the Cabinet of Ministers must take an oath to assume office.

In original Ukrainian:

Unofficial English translation:

Refusal to take an oath on the day of appointment is considered to be the refusal of his/her ministerial office.

United Kingdom

Oaths taken by the monarch
In the United Kingdom, no formal oath is essential to be taken by the monarch in relation to accession. The monarch is, however, required to take an oath regarding the security of the Church of Scotland. At a coronation, the monarch usually takes an oath but as a coronation is inessential, Monarchs need not take a similar oath in order to discharge their duties, as with the case of Edward VIII, who was never crowned during his one-year reign. The exact wording of the coronation oath of various monarchs has altered throughout the years without statutory authority but remain based on the oath as prescribed by the Coronation Oath Act 1688.

Coronation Oath
The following was the oath taken by Queen Elizabeth II at her coronation on 2 June 1953:

Oath relating to the security of the Church of Scotland
The following oath was made by King Charles III at his Accession Council on 10 September 2022, in accordance with the Protestant Religion and Presbyterian Church Act 1707:

Oath of Allegiance and Official Oath

A general Oath of Allegiance and Official Oath, are set out in the Promissory Oaths Act 1868 are required to be taken by various office-holders.

Members of the House of Commons or of the House of Lords are required to take the oath of allegiance in the House at the beginning of a new Parliament, as well as after a Demise of the Crown.

Section 84 of the Scotland Act 1998 requires members of the Scottish Parliament to take the Oath of Allegiance at a meeting of the Parliament. Members of the Scottish Executive and junior Scottish Ministers are additionally required to take the Official Oath.

Section 20 of the Government of Wales Act 1998 requires members of the National Assembly for Wales to take the oath of allegiance. A Welsh form of the Oath is prescribed by the National Assembly for Wales (Oath of Allegiance in Welsh) Order 1999.

Oath of Allegiance
The Oath of Allegiance is in the following form:

Official Oath
The Official Oath is in the following form:

Judicial Oath
The standard form of the judicial oath is set out in the Promissory Oaths Act 1868:

Those choosing affirm simply replace "do swear by Almighty God" with "solemnly sincerely and truly declare and affirm"

In Northern Ireland all references to the Sovereign were removed by the Justice (Northern Ireland) Act 2002.

Section 19(2) provides that the oath is—

Section 19(3) provides that the affirmation and declaration is—

Armed forces
All persons enlisting in the British Armed Forces are required to attest to the following oath or equivalent affirmation:

Privy Counsellors
Privy Counsellors take office on being "sworn of the Privy Council". It was formerly regarded as criminal to disclose the form of Privy Council oath, which includes an undertaking of secrecy as to the proceedings in Council (where the Oath is taken). On 20 July 1998 it was published by the President of the Council in answer to a written parliamentary question:

You do swear by Almighty God to be a true and faithful Servant unto the Queen's Majesty, as one of Her Majesty's Privy Council. You will not know or understand of any manner of thing to be attempted, done, or spoken against Her Majesty's Person, Honour, Crown, or Dignity Royal, but you will lett and withstand the same to the uttermost of your Power, and either cause it to be revealed to Her Majesty Herself, or to such of Her Privy Council as shall advertise Her Majesty of the same. You will, in all things to be moved, treated, and debated in Council, faithfully and truly declare your Mind and Opinion, according to your Heart and Conscience; and will keep secret all Matters committed and revealed unto you, or that shall be treated of secretly in Council. And if any of the said Treaties or Counsels shall touch any of the Counsellors, you will not reveal it unto him, but will keep the same until such time as, by the Consent of Her Majesty, or of the Council, Publication shall be made thereof. You will to your uttermost bear Faith and Allegiance unto the Queen's Majesty; and will assist and defend all Jurisdictions, Pre-eminences, and Authorities, granted to Her Majesty, and annexed to the Crown by Acts of Parliament, or otherwise, against all Foreign Princes, Persons, Prelates, States, or Potentates. And generally in all things you will do as a faithful and true Servant ought to do to Her Majesty. So help you God.

Constables declaration
A person appointed to the office of constable of a police force in Scotland is required to make the following declaration:

I hereby do solemnly and sincerely and truly declare and affirm that I will faithfully discharge the duties of the office of constable.

United States

History of the oath
While the oath-taking dates back to the First Congress in 1789, the current oath is a product of the 1860s, drafted by Civil War–era members of Congress intent on ensnaring traitors.

In 1789, the 1st United States Congress created an oath to fulfill the requirement of Article VI of the United States Constitution:

 It also passed the Judiciary Act of 1789, which established an additional oath taken by federal judges:

The outbreak of the Civil War quickly transformed the routine act of oath-taking into one of enormous significance. In April 1861, a time of uncertain and shifting loyalties, President Abraham Lincoln ordered all federal civilian employees within the executive branch to take an expanded oath. When Congress convened for a brief emergency session in July, members echoed the president's action by enacting legislation requiring employees to take the expanded oath in support of the Union. This oath is the earliest direct predecessor of the modern version of the oath.

When Congress returned for its regular session in December 1861, members who believed that the Union had as much to fear from northern traitors as southern soldiers again revised the oath, adding a new first section known as the "Ironclad Test Oath". The war-inspired Test Oath, signed into law on July 2, 1862, required "every person elected or appointed to any office ... under the Government of the United States ... excepting the President of the United States" to swear or affirm that they had never previously engaged in criminal or disloyal conduct. Those government employees who failed to take the 1862 Test Oath would not receive a salary; those who swore falsely would be prosecuted for perjury and forever denied federal employment.

The Iron Clad oath signed into law under President Johnson's term as mandatory for members of Congress as well as federal employees.

I, A.B., do solemnly swear (or affirm) that I have never voluntarily borne arms against the United States since I have been a citizen thereof; that I have voluntarily given no aid, countenance, counsel or encouragement to person engaged in armed hostility thereto; that I have neither sought nor accepted nor attempted to exercise the functions of any office whatever, under any authority or pretended authority in hostility to the United States; that I have not yielded a voluntary support to any pretended government, authority, power, or constitution within the United States, hostile or inimical thereto. And I do further swear (or affirm) that, to the best of my knowledge and ability, I will support and defend the Constitution of the United States, against all enemies, foreign and domestic; that I will bear true faith and allegiance to the same; and I take this obligation freely, without any mental reservation or purpose of evasion, and that I will well and faithfully discharge the duties of the office on which I am about to enter, so help me God.

The 1862 oath's second section incorporated a different rendering of the hastily drafted 1861 oath. Although Congress did not extend coverage of the Ironclad Test Oath to its own members, many took it voluntarily. Angered by those who refused this symbolic act during a wartime crisis, and determined to prevent the eventual return of prewar southern leaders to positions of power in the national government, congressional hard-liners eventually succeeded by 1864 in making the Test Oath mandatory for all members.

The Senate then revised its rules to require that members not only take the Test Oath orally, but also that they "subscribe" to it by signing a printed copy. This condition reflected a wartime practice in which military and civilian authorities required anyone wishing to do business with the federal government to sign a copy of the Test Oath. The current practice of newly sworn senators signing individual pages in an oath book dates from this period.

As tensions cooled during the decade following the Civil War, Congress enacted private legislation permitting particular former Confederates to take only the second section of the 1862 oath. An 1868 public law prescribed this alternative oath for "any person who has participated in the late rebellion, and from whom all legal disabilities arising therefrom have been removed by act of Congress." Northerners immediately pointed to the new law's unfair double standard that required loyal Unionists to take the Test Oath's harsh first section while permitting ex-Confederates to ignore it. In 1884, a new generation of lawmakers quietly repealed the first section of the Test Oath, leaving intact the current affirmation of constitutional allegiance.

Federal executive and legislative branch oaths
In the United States, the oath of office for the President is specified in the Constitution (Article II, Section 1):

The oath may be sworn or affirmed (in which case it is called an affirmation instead of oath). Although not present in the text of the Constitution, it is customary for modern presidents to say "So help me God" after the end of the oath. For officers other than the President, the expression "So help me God" is explicitly prescribed, but the Judiciary Act of 1789 also explains when it can be omitted (specifically for oaths taken by court clerks): "Which words, so help me God, shall be omitted in all cases where an affirmation is admitted instead of an oath."

The Constitution (Article VI, clause 3) also specifies:

At the start of each new U.S. Congress, in January of every odd-numbered year, newly elected or re-elected Members of Congress – the entire House of Representatives and one-third of the Senate – must recite an oath:

This oath is also taken by the Vice President, members of the Cabinet, federal judges and all other civil and military officers and federal employees other than the President.

Federal judiciary oaths
In the United States, federal judges are required to take two oaths. The judicial oath is this:

The other is the same oath that all other officers of the United States (save the President) take:

Federal statute specifically says that the latter oath "does not affect other oaths required by law."

Military oaths – federal and state

The military oath is the same as the one taken by members of the Congress, judicial officers, and all other officers except for the President. Members of the United States National Guard, however, take an additional oath as well.

State and local oaths
The oaths of state and local officials are largely patterned on the federal oath of constitutional allegiance. An example would be the oath taken by all New York government officials:

Uruguay 
In Uruguay, before taking office, the President and Vice President are required by Article 158 of the Constitution to take an affirmation before General Assembly in joint session:

In Spanish:In English:The National Representatives and Senators take the Oath based on the regulations of the respective Chamber:

In Spanish:In English:

Venezuela 

The President of Venezuela, upon assumption of the office on his inauguration, is asked by the President of the National Assembly (until 1999, the Senate President, on behalf of the entire National Federal Congress), holding a copy of the Constitution of Venezuela, the following:

With the right hand on the shoulder level he answers with a "Yes, I swear" and the President then responds: "If you do so, before God and the Fatherland your duties will be performed, and it will be demanded of you if you not. Therefore, in the name of the Republic and by the authority of the law, I invest you as Constitutional President of the Republic as of this moment for this term period." Then the Presidential Sash (with the colors and coat of arms from the Flag of Venezuela and the collar of the Order of the Liberatiors is turned over to him from the outgoing President, but if the case is that of succession due to death of office of his predecessor both items are cased and are given to him by the National Assembly President instead. If reelected the method is the same as after the sudden death of the President while in office.

Vietnam 

According to 2013 Constitution, the President of Vietnam, Prime Minister of Vietnam, President of the National Assembly of Vietnam and Chief Justice of Vietnam must take the oath every first plenary session of the National Assembly.

The following is the oath taken by the President, Prime Minister, President of the National Assembly and Chief Justice:

"In front of the sacred red flag with yellow star of the Fatherland, the National Assembly, and the electors of the whole country, I - as (President, Prime Minister, President of the National Assembly or Chief Justice of the Socialist Republic of Vietnam) - pledge thus to be forever absolutely remain loyal to the Fatherland, the people and the Constitution of the Socialist Republic of Vietnam. I vow to practice and strive to fulfill the tasks assigned by the Party, State and People to me and my office."

After the Oath was taken, the President of the National Assembly (Standing Vice President of the National Assembly if the oath taker is the President of the National Assembly) will say: "The National Assembly has confirmed this oath."

Catholic Church

The Roman Catholic Church requires all of its clergy before ordination and most of those promoted to positions of authority to make a profession of faith, as follows. It is very similar to the Apostles' Creed and the Nicene Creed (referred to as the Symbol of Faith).

Further, all of those promoted to positions of authority (vicars general, judicial vicars, episcopal vicars, pastors of parishes and superiors within religious orders) or with teaching responsibilities (rectors of seminaries, professors at seminaries, heads or Catholic universities or professors on the faculties of Catholic colleges and universities who teach subjects involving religion), and all those ordained deacons (and therefore all those who will also later be ordained priests) to take the following "Oath of Fidelity"

See also
 Coronation Oath Act 1688
 Hong Kong Legislative Council oath-taking controversy
 List of U.S. presidential swearing-ins
 Oath of allegiance
 Oath of citizenship
 Oath of enlistment

Explanatory notes

Citations

Further reading
 Steve Sheppard (2009). "What Oaths Meant to the Framers' Generation: A Preliminary Sketch". Cardozo L. Rev. de novo. pp. 273–283.

External links

 U.S. Senate: Oath of Office
 U.S. Code, Title 5, Sec. 3331: Oath of Office
 Pictures of various world leaders taking their oaths of office

Oaths
Inauguration